Hamuchtar (Hebrew: המוכתר), Gilad Philip Ben-David, b. 1971, is a singer and cabaret artist who began his career in Tel Aviv in the late 1980s.  He has also played various films most notably “Amazing Grace” by the late director Amos Guttman, as well as directing his own films and theatre plays. His musical style incorporates cabaret, mizrahi music, Yemenite music and electronica.

Chronology

Music

1988 „Charlie“ - self produced vinyl record (Israel)

1989 „Horrible Days“- with kozo-bass and drum (Israel)

1990-1992 „The Moon and the Parthenon“ - chansons

1991 „Soldiers and Hookers“ - electro Hispanic nights with original live show integrated dialogues performed by two actors.

1993 „Imperial“ - (Israel)

1994 Dance CD released by Head Artzi Record Co. after five successful singles

1995 „Good Night“ - co-producer Nutty (Dance) . Project was halted and recordings lost

1996 „Slave“ CD coproduced with Uri Frost (London)

1997 „Death in an Armchair“ (Amsterdam, London)

1999 „Imperial“ - live CD with Doron Burstein-piano

2000 „Cocktail“ - 17 all-time tracks (Israel)

2001 „Dirty little thing“ -with Doron Burstein (Berlin)

2001 „Above the lower “Urban gospels with Oly (London)

2002 „Allenby“ a CD diving into the darkest of Yemenite music with Reuven Natan (Israel)

2002 „Safari“  with Uri Frost

2003 „Berlin Nights“ -with Doron Burstein (Berlin)

2004 „The Successful Show“- musicshow premiere at „Spirit“ (New York)

2005 „Hausverbotsclub“  (Berlin)

2005 „Half a zebra half a man“ one man freak show

2006 „I am a woman“ CD

2007 „The way of all flesh“ CD

2008 „The Blintches House“ CD

2008 „Drum and Prophecy“
 
2008 „Social club metropolitan“ an online CD

2009 „I am a Woman. Ver. 2

2009 „Schlagerwurst“

2011 „YaffaDamari”

2015 „Electric Palm Tree show”- „Peach Moon Festival”, Tokyo. Penguin, Tel Aviv. „Musrara Mix Festival”, Jerusalem

2016 „The Model” CD

2018 „Cheap and Cheerful”

2019 „The Best of 1988-2018” CD

Film, Video, TV

1988 ″The Spider“ - 40 min 8 mm film written and directed by Hamuchtar (Israel)

1991 ″Amazing Grace“ - nominated for Best Foreign Film the same year (Israel)at Cannes - directed by A. Gutmann, featuring Hamuchtar

1991 ″Astray“ - 40 min video film directed and played by Hamuchtar (Israel)

1991-1994 various TV appearances, in particular New Year’s Eve 1993 with the legendary Allenby Choir (Israel)

1994 ″Angel“ and ″Tears“ - music videos for these two pre-CD release singles, directed and produced by Hamuchtar (Israel)

1997 ″Vader Sport“ - director Femke for Dutch RTL TV featuring Hamuchtar (NL)

1998 ″Airport“ - directed by Gil Landberg for Israeli Television and taken to cinema the same year - supporting actor Hamuchtar (Israel)

1999 ″Jose“ - feature film directed by T. Genehar featuring Hamuchtar (Israel)

2000 ″Paradiso“ - 40 min ambient video, directed and acted by Hamuchtar (Israel)

2003 ″Entertaining little night display“ -2 hours film written and directed by Hamuchtar (D)

2005 ″Digger“ a half an hour film showing Hamuchtar  digging his own grave ( Berlin)

2005 ″Imperial“ - music video directed by Hamuchtar (Israel)

2005 ″Bordeaux“ - music video directed & edited by Hamuchtar (Israel)

2007 ″Sports wear“and ″An Encore" - music video directed & edited by Hamuchtar (Berlin)

2007 ″The Moon and the Parthenon“ 1992 live show reedited and released on DVD (Berlin)

2009 ″Ra-ah“ a music video directed & edited by Hamuchtar

2009 ″Secret diaries of a lone voyeur“ 5 hours long ambient movie

2014 The Kindergarten Teacher, Israeli feature directed by Nadav Lapid; Hamuchtar acted the part of a poetry teacher (Israel)

Writing

1991 „A Soldier and a Hooker“ - five short combative dialogues (Israel)

1993 „1,5“ and „Ice-cream“ - two short stories (Israel)

1994 „Happy Birthday“ - theatre monologue (Israel)

1996 „The Translated Mythology of the Truth“ - theatre monologue co-writer Maria Segura Thijssen (NL)

1997 „The Rising“ - adults puppet play (GB)

1998 „Black Octopus“ - theatre play for five actors (GB)

1999 „Inside a Woman’s Handbag“ - screen play transliterated by Annie Kelley (GB)

2001 „Last Coffee“ a theatre play (GB)

2003 „The cemetery“ a screen play (D)

2003/04 „Schwarzer Tintenfisch“ - filmscript for 8 actors, translated to German by Miri Kämpfer (D)
 
2006	„The fury of the Gutted Camel“ translated to German the same year by Manfred Niepel (D)

2007	„Good day for a pink Hat“ children book inc.illustrations translated to German by Cosima Lemke (D)

2009    „The 13th month “ a children book inc.illustrations

2019    „A Cluster of Snakes“, Hamuchtar's poetry anthology, editor: Idan Zivoni. Resling Publishing.

Opera, Theatre

2013 - „Yvonne” - An opera (composer and director), starring Daniella Lugassi, produced by "Fringe Opera Center", Tel-Aviv. Premiered in Tel-aviv Central Bus Station's site.

2014 - „The Plastic Wood” - A theatre play for 5 actors(writer and director), Karov Theatre, Israel. Premiered in the "Citizen Here Festival".

2015 - „The Dyke” - Utopic Middle-Eastern opera (composer and director). Premiered in Cameri Theater, Tel Aviv.

2017 - „Null Stern Hotel” - With opera singer Niva Eshed (composer and director). Premiered in „Neu West Berlin”, Berlin, and in Einav Auditorium, Tel-Aviv, 2019.

References

21st-century Israeli male singers
Living people
1971 births
Israeli film directors
Israeli male film actors
Israeli male short story writers
Israeli short story writers
Israeli male screenwriters
People from Rishon LeZion
Musicians from Tel Aviv
20th-century Israeli male actors
21st-century Israeli male actors
Israeli people of Yemeni-Jewish descent
Israeli people of Dutch-Jewish descent
20th-century Israeli male singers